Bayraklı is a metropolitan district of İzmir and a district of İzmir Province in Turkey. Bayraklı was turned into a district by a decree of the Government of Turkey on March 6, 2008. Previously, it was a quarter within İzmir's Karşıyaka district.

See also
Smyrna
Bayraklı Tunnels

References 

Populated places in İzmir Province
Districts of İzmir Province